Events from the year 1579 in the Kingdom of Scotland.

Incumbents
Monarch – James VI

Events
September
11-year old James VI declares the end of his minority and assumes personal rule with a ceremony in Edinburgh.
Esmé Stewart, Sieur d'Aubigny, James's cousin, arrives from France and becomes the king's first favourite.
First of the Scottish Poor Laws passed.
Members of the Glasgow Trades House defend Glasgow Cathedral from depredation.

Births
 23 August – Thomas Dempster, Catholic scholar and historian (died 1625)
Jean Kincaid, mariticide (executed 1600)
John Ogilvie (saint), Jesuit (executed 1615)
Approximate date –
John Cameron, Calvinist theologian (died 1625)
Arthur Johnston, poet and physician (died 1641)
Tobias Hume, composer (died 1645 in England)

Deaths
 25 April – John Stewart, 4th Earl of Atholl, noble
Sir James MacGill, courtier
Possible date –
David Peebles, religious composer (born )
James Sandilands, 1st Lord Torphichen, noble (born )

See also
 Timeline of Scottish history

References